Stanley Howard Weitzman (born March 16, 1927, in Mill Valley, California; died February 16, 2017) was a Research Scientist Emeritus at Division of Fishes, National Museum of Natural History, Washington, D.C.

Life and career
He received his Bachelor's (1951) and Master's (1953) degrees in biology from the University of California, Berkeley, and his PhD (1960) from Stanford University as a student of the venerable killifish expert, George Sprague Myers. Weitzman began his long and distinguished career as a Curator in the Division of Fishes, National Museum of Natural History, in 1962. At that time he moved from California with his wife Marilyn and their two children.

Awards and recognition
Weitzman's outstanding research was recognized by his peers: he received the Robert H. Gibbs, Jr. Memorial Award for Excellence in Systematic Ichthyology for an outstanding body of published work in systematic ichthyology from the American Society of Ichthyologists and Herpetologists in 1991, and was honored at an international symposium on neotropical fishes in Brazil with an award for his “Invaluable Contributions to Neotropical Ichthyology” in 1997.

Taxon named in his honor 
Numerous taxa have been named after Weitzman:
Lophiobrycon weitzmani R. M. C. Castro, A. C. Ribeiro, Benine & A. L. A. Melo, 2003 is a species of small characin endemic to Brazil, where it is found in the upper Paraná River basin.
 the darter Microcharacidium weitzmani Buckup, 1993
 the darter Poecilocharax weitzmani Géry, 1965.
 the Two Saddle cory cat Corydoras weitzmani Nijssen, 1971.
 the Atlantic pearlside or Weitzman's pearlside Maurolicus weitzmani Parin & Kobyliansky, 1993. 
 the small freshwater fish Knodus weitzmani (Menezes, Netto-Ferreira & K. M. Ferreira, 2009)
 Jenynsia weitzmani Ghedotti, A. D. Meisner & Lucinda, 2001.
 Pseudocorynopoma stanleyi Malabarba, Chuctaya, Hirschmann, Oliveira & Thomaz, 2020

Taxon described by him
See :Category:Taxa named by Stanley Howard Weitzman

References

1927 births
2017 deaths
American ichthyologists
People from Mill Valley, California
People from California
Ichthyologists